Władysław Rząb (18 May 1910 — 13 August 1992) was a Polish painter and  sculptor.

Biography 
Władysław Rząb was born on 18 May 1910 in Zgierz in Poland in a working-class family. His paintings and sculptures were presented at national and regional painting exhibitions of amateur art in Poland and abroad in the period 1946 - 2012. He was a member of the Association of the Polish Artist starting 1986. In 2005 one of the street in Zgierz was named his name.

Władysław Rząb as an artist belonged to the ‘expressionism school’ of paintings.

Works in collections of 
 Silesian Museum in Katowice
 Museum of the Town of Zgierz
 Historical Museum of the City of Łódź
 Jacek Malczewski Museum in Radom
 Ethnographic Museum in Cracow

External links 
 http://www.artnet.com/artists/wladyslaw-rzab/past-auction-results

1910 births
1992 deaths
20th-century Polish painters
20th-century Polish male artists
Polish sculptors
Polish male sculptors
20th-century sculptors
Polish male painters